T. Eugene Thornton (June 17, 1911 – May 9, 1967) was a justice of the Iowa Supreme Court from January 1, 1959, to May 9, 1967, appointed from Black Hawk County, Iowa.

References

External links

Justices of the Iowa Supreme Court
1911 births
1967 deaths
20th-century American judges